A number of steamships have carried the name Titania.
 , a passenger ship in service 1908–16, requisition as HMS Tithonus, torpedoed and sunk in 1918.
 , a coaster in service 1939–45

See also
 , a Royal Navy submarine depot ship, 1915–1949

Ship names